The Burton Agnes drum is a carved chalk cylinder dated from 3005 to 2890 BC which was found in 2015 near Burton Agnes, East Riding of Yorkshire, England. The British Museum has described it as "the most important piece of prehistoric art to be found in Britain in the last 100 years" and "one of the most significant ancient objects ever found on the British Isles". It was found in the grave of three children, along with a chalk ball and a bone pin.

The drum was found by archaeologist Alice Beasley, working for Allen Archaeology under director Mark Allen, during a routine investigation made as part of the planning application for a biogas power station to be built on the land, part of the Burton Agnes estate. She has described the find: 
Allen has said:

The Burton Agnes drum was displayed to the public for the first time as part of the 2022 World of Stonehenge exhibition at the British Museum, alongside the three Folkton drums.

References

Stone Age sites in England
Prehistoric art
2015 archaeological discoveries
Archaeology of the East Riding of Yorkshire